The Arts and Crafts movement was an artistic and design movement originating in late 19th-century Europe.

Arts & Crafts may also refer to:
 Arts and crafts or handicrafts, activities related to making things with one's own hands and skill, or examples of the output of such activity
 Arts & Crafts Productions, an independent music publisher in Toronto, Ontario, Canada
 "Arts and Crafts", a song by Red Light Company

See also
Mark A. Landis, subject of the documentary film Art and Craft (2014)